Topli Vrh (also Topli Vrh nad Bistrico) is a remote abandoned settlement in the Municipality of Črnomelj in the White Carniola area of southeastern Slovenia. The area is part of the traditional region of Lower Carniola and is now included in the Southeast Slovenia Statistical Region. Its territory is now part of the village of Rožič Vrh.

History
Topli Vrh was a Gottschee German village. In 1770 it had 11 houses, but in 1931 only six. It was burned by Italian troops during the Rog Offensive in the summer of 1942 and was not rebuilt. The Loka pri Črmošnjice hunting club built a hunting lodge at the site in 1960.

References

External links
Topli Vrh on Geopedia
Pre–World War II list of oeconyms and family names in Topli Vrh

Former populated places in the Municipality of Črnomelj